Angelo Corsi (born 18 June 1989) is an Italian footballer who plays as a defender.

Club career
On 28 January 2022, he joined Vibonese on loan.

References

External links
 
 

1989 births
People from Ferentino
Living people
Italian footballers
Delfino Pescara 1936 players
S.P.A.L. players
U.S. Pergolettese 1932 players
Cosenza Calcio players
U.S. Vibonese Calcio players
Serie B players
Serie C players
Association football defenders
Footballers from Lazio
Sportspeople from the Province of Frosinone